Hilliard is a township in the Canadian province of Ontario, located within the Timiskaming District. Its main community is Hilliardton, located along Secondary Highway 569. The smaller communities of Couttsville and Whitewood Grove are also located within the township.

The township was named in honour of Daniel Hilliard, member of the Legislative Assembly of Ontario from 1886 to 1888.

Demographics 

Mother tongue:
 English as first language: 75%
 French as first language: 24%
 English and French as first language: 1%
 Other as first language: 0%

See also
List of townships in Ontario
List of francophone communities in Ontario

References

Municipalities in Timiskaming District
Single-tier municipalities in Ontario
Township municipalities in Ontario